Diane McFarlin is an American educator and author. She retired in 2021 as dean of the University of Florida College of Journalism and Communications.

Career 
McFarlin began her journalism career in high school and took a reporting job at the Sarasota (FL) Herald-Tribune after earning her degree at the University of Florida. She became managing editor at 30 and was named executive editor of The Gainesville Sun three years later. She then returned to the Herald-Tribune, serving as executive editor for a decade and publisher for 13 years. McFarlin became dean of the UFC College of Journalism and Communications in January 2013.

McFarlin is a past president of the American Society of News Editors and has served six times as a juror for the Pulitzer Prizes She has taught at the Centers for Independent Journalism in Prague and Bucharest, and addressed the World Editors Forum on the subject of multimedia newsrooms. McFarlin has worked on behalf of numerous nonprofit organizations and launched the Season of Sharing charitable fund, which has raised $19 million to provide crisis funding to families on the brink of homelessness.

References

External links
University of Florida College of Journalism and Communications Bio
Opinion: Are Girls Still in the Balcony

American academic administrators
American newspaper publishers (people)
American women journalists
Women heads of universities and colleges
Living people
University of Florida alumni
University of Florida faculty
Year of birth missing (living people)
American women academics
21st-century American women